Charles Stanhope (1673–1760) was an English barrister and Whig politician who sat in the House of Commons from 1717 to 1741. Deeply implicated in transactions related to the South Sea Bubble, possibly concerned with political corruption, he was strongly defended by those in government, and was acquitted of all charges brought against him.

Early life

Stanhope was the second son of John Stanhope of Elvaston, Derbyshire, and his wife Dorothy Agard, daughter of Charles Agard of Foston, Derbyshire.   He was admitted at the Inner Temple and was called to the bar in 1703. He succeeded his elder brother Thomas  to the family estates in 1730.

Career
Stanhope was the cousin of James Stanhope, 1st Earl Stanhope who made him his under-secretary in 1714. He served as Secretary to the Treasury from 1717 to 1721. James Stanhope and Charles Spencer, 3rd Earl of Sunderland were investigated over dealings in South Sea Company stock after the Bubble, and Charles Stanhope also; but he avoided the ruin of political career that came upon Sunderland.

Stanhope was seeking procurement, but the new King George II discovered among his father's papers a  note written by Stanhope with proposals for drastic action against him during a family quarrel. The King blocked any favours towards Stanhope, but Stanhope attributed his failure to secure office to Walpole and became his bitter enemy. While he owed his seat to Newcastle, he supported the government in all divisions except on the civil list arrears in 1729. He did not stand in 1741.

Stanhope became a Fellow of the Royal Society in 1726.

Death and legacy
Stanhope died unmarried in 1760. His  younger brother was William Stanhope, 1st Earl of Harrington, the father of William Stanhope, 2nd Earl of Harrington.

Notes

1673 births
1760 deaths
English barristers
Tory members of the Parliament of Great Britain
British MPs 1715–1722
British MPs 1722–1727
British MPs 1727–1734
British MPs 1734–1741
Fellows of the Royal Society
Freemasons of the Premier Grand Lodge of England
Charles